USS Shrike is a name used more than once by the United States Navy:

 USS Shrike (AM-50), a planned  from Baltimore Dry Dock and Shipbuilding Company; construction canceled 4 December 1918
 , laid down on 1 September 1953 by Tampa Marine Co., Tampa, Florida.

United States Navy ship names